Taghreed El-Khodary is a Palestinian journalist who is a visiting scholar in the Middle East Program at the Carnegie Endowment, where her research focuses on the future of Gaza. She is also a 2010 Heinrich Boell Fellow. She is editor at fanack.com,

From 2001 to 2009, El-Khodary reported from Gaza for The New York Times. She stopped reporting for the Times soon after the Electronic Intifada reported that Ethan Bronner, the Jerusalem bureau chief of the Times, has a son serving in the Israeli army. The Times decided not to remove Bronner from his position, and El-Khodary resigned, saying she felt it was “not wise” for her to stay.  “It’s risky,” she said in a panel discussion at the Palestine Center in Washington DC. “It’s very sensitive and I was really disappointed that [the New York Times] took this decision but they understand why I left.”

Background

El-Khodary was born in Gaza and holds an undergraduate degree in communications from the American University in Cairo and an MS in mass communication from Murray State University, which she attended as a Fulbright Scholar.  El-Khodary later returned to the U.S. to take up a Nieman Fellowship at Harvard University in 2006 as the Ruth Cowan Nash Fellow, and again in 2010 as a Heinrich Boell Fellow and visiting scholar with the Carnegie Endowment for International Peace.

Professional work

El-Khodary has worked as a radio reporter for Voice of America; television reporter for Al Jazeera; and TV news correspondent for Al Hayat LBC, in addition to work on individual documentaries for National Geographic, PBS (US), ITV (UK), and CBC (Canada).  In 2010 she led a three-week mentorship program on election coverage for journalists in northern Sudan under the auspices of the United Nations Development Programme and Linnaeus University’s Fojo Media Institute.

El-Khodary came to public attention during the 2008–2009 Israel–Gaza conflict, when Israel prevented correspondents from crossing the Gaza-Israel border and she was among the few correspondents reporting from Gaza. She describes herself as among the "very few objective reporters" covering the conflict. and was praised for the "in-depth, balanced coverage" of the conflict. She feels that her identity, as a Palestinian, was useful to her reporting in Gaza because she was able to "live the story".

After it came out that then NYT's Jerusalem bureau chief, Ethan Bronner, had a son serving an enlistment in the Israeli Defense Forces, and that the New York Times refused to fire him after this was made public, El-Khodary decided to leave her NYT post.

References

External links 

Q & A with Taghreed-el-Khodary in gaza The New York Times.

Year of birth missing (living people)
Living people
The New York Times writers
Palestinian journalists
Murray State University alumni
Fulbright alumni